
Gmina Raczki is a rural gmina (administrative district) in Suwałki County, Podlaskie Voivodeship, in north-eastern Poland.

Villages
Gmina Raczki contains the villages and settlements of Bakaniuk, Bolesty, Chodźki, Dowspuda, Franciszkowo, Jankielówka, Jaśki, Józefowo, Koniecbór, Korytki, Krukówek, Kurianki Drugie, Kurianki Pierwsze, Lipówka, Lipowo, Ludwinowo, Małe Raczki, Moczydły, Planta, Podwysokie, Rabalina, Raczki, Rudniki, Sidory, Słoboda, Stoki, Sucha Wieś, Szczodruchy, Szkocja, Wasilówka, Wierciochy, Witówka, Wronowo, Wysokie, Ziółkowo and Żubrynek.

Neighbouring gminas
Gmina Raczki is bordered by the gminas of Augustów, Bakałarzewo, Kalinowo, Nowinka, Suwałki and Wieliczki.

References
 Polish official population figures 2006

Raczki
Suwałki County